Nikolai Igorevich Lebedev (born 16 November 1966) is a Russian film director, screenwriter and film producer. Born in Kishinev (now Chișinău), Soviet Union (now Moldova).

He is best known as the director, writer, and producer of Wolfhound (2007) and Legend № 17 (2013), both of which became well grossing films in Russian cinema. Other films include the critically lauded drama The Star (2002), the drama film Soundtrack of Passion (2009), and the disaster film Flight Crew (2016).

Filmography

References

External links

1966 births
Living people
Russian film directors
Gerasimov Institute of Cinematography alumni
Russian screenwriters
Film people from Chișinău